Balani may refer to:
Bălani, a village in Stănești, Gorj, Romania
Balani, Iran
Balani (surname)